Kirkmaiden (sometimes Maidenkirk) is a small settlement in Galloway, Scotland, located approximately  south of Stranraer.  It gives its name to Kirkmaiden parish, which covers the southern end of the Rhinns of Galloway peninsula.

Until Union with England, Scotland's equivalent of the phrase "Land's End to John o' Groats" was often "John o' Groats to Maidenkirk", as Maidenkirk was traditionally considered the southernmost part of that country. It can be found in the song, The Lady of Kenmure:

Villages in Dumfries and Galloway
Rhins of Galloway